Tices Shoal is a shoal located in Barnegat Bay near Island Beach State Park, in Lacey Township, Ocean County, New Jersey, United States. However the name is also used to describe a location commonly used by boats and other water craft slightly to the east. This connects the boat anchorage to the beaches of the park. In the summer of 2015, a fee was added to walk from the anchorage to Island Beach State Park while lifeguards are on duty.

References

External links
 Island Beach State Park - Division of Parks and Forestry
 ticesshoal.com

Geography of Ocean County, New Jersey
State parks of New Jersey